Junín Airport  was a domestic airport serving Junín, a city in the Buenos Aires Province of Argentina.

Current aerial imagery shows the runway is marked closed. Google Earth Historical Imagery (8/31/2009), (9/9/2013) show the closure was sometime after August 2009.

The Junin VOR and non-directional beacon (Idents: NIN) are located on the field.

Historical facts
World gliding championship in 1963:
http://www.volaravela.com.ar/mundial.htm?i=1

Accidents and incidents
17 May 1948: A FAMA Viking 615, tail number LV-AFL, crashed on landing at the airport while performing a test flight, catching fire. There were no reported fatalities but the aircraft was written off.

See also

Transport in Argentina
List of airports in Argentina

References

External links
OpenStreetMap - Junín Airport closed

Defunct airports
Airports in Argentina